The 8th European Athletics Championships were held from 30 August to 4 September 1966 in the Nép Stadium in Budapest, Hungary. Contemporaneous reports on the event were given in the Glasgow Herald.

A new IAAF ruling was applied for the first time making gender verification for female events mandatory.  As a consequence, all women competitors were forced to have a sex check.  Several of the greatest women athletes missed this year's championships, among them world record holders Iolanda Balaș (high jump) from Romania, as well as Tamara Press (shot put) and Tatyana Shchelkanova (long jump), both from the Soviet Union.

Medal summary
Complete results were published.

Men

Women

 The women's 100 metres gold medallist Ewa Kłobukowska equalled the championship record twice in qualifying, running 11.4 seconds.

Medal table

Participation
According to an unofficial count, 770 athletes from 29 countries participated in the event, one athletes more than the official number of 769 and one country less than the official number of 30 as published.

 (20)
 (11)
 (16)
 (14)
 (49)
 (7)
 (61)
 (16)
 (52)
 (1)
 (15)
 (68)
 (3)
 (8)
 (35)
 (3)
 (19)
 (15)
 (56)
 (1)
 (18)
 (83)
 (7)
 (25)
 (13)
 (10)
 (57)
 (74)
 (13)

References

Results

External links
 EAA
 Athletix

 
European Athletics Championships
European Athletics Championships
European Athletics Championships
International athletics competitions hosted by Hungary
Athletics Championships
International sports competitions in Budapest
August 1966 sports events in Europe
September 1966 sports events in Europe
1960s in Budapest